The Very Best of Slim Dusty is a greatest hits album by Australian country recording artist Slim Dusty. In 2014, the album was certified 5× platinum.

In October 2010, the album was listed at number 24 on the 100 Best Australian Albums of the past 50 years.

In July 2018, the album achieved a milestone of 1000 weeks in the ARIA Country Albums Chart. Dusty is the first artist to ever achieve this milestone. Dan Rosen, Chief Executive of ARIA said, “ARIA would like to congratulate the late ARIA Hall Of Famer Slim Dusty on this amazing achievement. To see an artist reach this milestone is a testament to the King of Country's enduring appeal and incredible artistry.”

Reception

Adrian Zupp from AllMusic said "The Very Best of Slim Dusty does an admirable job, considering the vast wealth of material available to draw from" adding "The melodies are sometimes sweet, sometimes salty, and the language is that of the 'everyman'."

Track listing

 The 1998 had 24 tracks and did not include "Looking Forward, Looking Back". This track was added as track one in 2003, pushing all other tracks to be number lower than the original pressing.

Charts

Weekly charts

Year-end charts

Certifications

Release history

References

1998 greatest hits albums
Compilation albums by Australian artists
EMI Records albums
Slim Dusty albums